Solicoccozyma phenolicus (synonym Cryptococcus phenolicus) is a fungus species in the family Piskurozymaceae, typically found in its yeast state.

References

External links 

Tremellomycetes